Tan Sri Sabbaruddin bin Chik (13 December 1941 – 4 December 2021) was a Malaysian politician who served as Minister of Culture, Arts and Tourism from 1987 to 1996.

Education
Chik graduated with a BA (Hons) from the University of Malaya in 1966 and subsequently obtained his master's degree in Public Administration from the Institute of Social Studies, in the Netherlands in 1974.

Career

Public service
Chik served as the Assistant State Secretary of Negeri Sembilan in 1966. A year later, he was appointed the Assistant Secretary for the Ministry of Foreign Affairs. Then, he was promoted as Second Secretary at the Malaysian Embassy in Saigon, Vietnam. He was then appointed the Charge d'affaires of the Embassy (1969–1971).

He then rose to various positions in the public services, including as the Principal Assistant Secretary at the Prime Minister's Department, Director of Socio-Economic Planning Unit in the Prime Minister's Department and Director of International Trade, Ministry of Trade and Industry from 1971 to 1979.

Finally, he served as the Deputy State Secretary for the Government of Selangor from 1980 to 1981.

Politics
Chik began his political career when he contested the Temerloh parliamentary seats and holding the seat from 1982 to 1999. He was then made the Deputy Finance Minister in 1982 to 1987 under Tun Dr. Mahathir Mohamad cabinet. He was then appointed Minister of Cultural, Arts and Tourism from 1987 to 1999.

Retirement
Chik was the chairman in various companies such as Amanah Raya Berhad, Bank Kerjasama Rakyat Malaysia Berhad, Priceworth International Berhad, Eden Inc. Berhad (also known as Eden Enterprises (M) Bhd), Pernas Trading Sdn Bhd, Malaysian Electronic Payment System Sdn Bhd, Nudex Ventures Sdn. Bhd and IPTB Sdn Bhd.

Death
Chik died from COVID-19 at University Malaya Medical Centre in Kuala Lumpur on 4 December 2021, aged 79 during the COVID-19 pandemic in Malaysia. He was buried at the Bukit Kiara Muslim Cemetery in Kuala Lumpur.

Election results

Honours

Honours of Malaysia
 :
 Commander of the Order of Loyalty to the Crown of Malaysia (PSM) – Tan Sri (2000)
 :
  Knight Companion of the Order of Sultan Ahmad Shah of Pahang (DSAP) – Dato' (1982)
  Grand Knight of the Order of the Crown of Pahang (SIMP) – Dato', later Dato' Indera (1988)
 Grand Knight of the Order of Sultan Ahmad Shah of Pahang (SSAP) – Dato' Sri (1998)
 :
 Companion of the Order of the Crown of Selangor (SMS) (1982)
 Knight Commander of the Order of the Crown of Selangor (DPMS) – Dato' (1992)

See also

 List of deaths due to COVID-19 - notable individual deaths

References

1941 births
2021 deaths
People from Pahang
Malaysian people of Malay descent
Malaysian Muslims
Malaysian civil servants
United Malays National Organisation politicians
Members of the Dewan Rakyat
Government ministers of Malaysia
National University of Malaysia alumni
Commanders of the Order of Loyalty to the Crown of Malaysia
Knights Commander of the Order of the Crown of Selangor
Deaths from the COVID-19 pandemic in Malaysia